Muhlenbergia filiformis,  known by the common name Pullup muhly, is a species of grass. It is native to western North America from western Canada to northern Mexico.

Pullup muhly grows in many types of moist to wet habitats.

Description
Muhlenbergia filiformis is an annual herb producing clumps of decumbent stems up to 30 centimeters long which root where their nodes touch the substrate. The inflorescence is a narrow, cylindrical array of appressed branches bearing many spikelets each about a millimeter long.

External links
Jepson Manual Treatment - Muhlenbergia filiformis
USDA Plants Profile
Grass Manual Treatment
Muhlenbergia filiformis - Photo gallery

filiformis
Grasses of the United States
Grasses of Canada
Grasses of Mexico
Native grasses of the Great Plains region
Native grasses of California
Flora of Northwestern Mexico
Flora of the Northwestern United States
Flora of the Western United States
Flora of New Mexico
Flora of British Columbia
Flora of the Sierra Nevada (United States)
Natural history of the California Coast Ranges
Flora without expected TNC conservation status